Michele Ceccoli (born 4 December 1973) is a Sammarinese former footballer who played as a goalkeeper. He made three appearances the San Marino national team in 2005.

References

1973 births
Living people
Sammarinese footballers
Association football goalkeepers
San Marino international footballers
A.C. Libertas players
S.P. Tre Fiori players